Osorius planifrons is a species of unmargined rove beetle in the family Staphylinidae. It is found in Central America and North America.

References

Further reading

 
 
 
 
 
 
 
 
 
 
 
 

Osoriinae
Beetles described in 1877
Beetles of North America